141 Mayflower Street in the Larimer neighborhood of Pittsburgh, Pennsylvania, was built circa 1885.  It was added to the List of City of Pittsburgh historic designations in June 1999.

References

Houses in Pittsburgh
Houses completed in 1885